) is a 1993–99 musical composition by the American contemporary classical composer Philip Glass. Its first recording was performed by the Brazilian instrumental group Uakti.

Originally composed as a dance score for a ballet company of Belo Horizonte (Grupo Corpo), following the introduction between Uakti and Philip Glass by Paul Simon, it draws inspiration from the Amazon waters with tones of classical, new age and jazz music. The track listing dedicates each song to one of the rivers:
 Tiquiê River
 Japurá River
 Purus River
 Negro River
 Madeira River
 Tapajós River
 Paru River
 Xingu River
 Amazon River (version of Etude No. 2 Vol. 1 for piano)

A last title much in the same style but departing from this nomenclature is also part of the album:

 Metamorphosis

Glass composed the music which the group performed under the artistic direction of, and with arrangements by,  (also at the strings). This was the first time that Glass's music was arranged by another composer. Paulo Sérgio dos Santos and Décio de Souza Ramos Filho played the percussion instruments and Artur Andrés Ribeiro the woodwinds. Regina Stela Amaral and Michael Riesman complemented Uakti's performance of the work at the keyboard. Glass described the result as "a true melding of my music with their sensibilities."

In 2017, Charles Coleman released an orchestral arrangement of the work featuring the MDR Leipzig Radio Symphony Orchestra and Absolute Ensemble, conducted by Kristjan Jarvi.

References

External links
 Entry for Aguas de Amazonia on Philip Glass's website

Compositions by Philip Glass
Philip Glass albums
1999 classical albums
1999 compositions